Calango (Portuguese: tropidurus lizard) is the second studio album by Brazilian band Skank, released in 1994. It contains the hits "Esmola", "É Proibido Fumar" (a Roberto Carlos cover), and "Pacato Cidadão". Calango sold approximately 1.2 million copies.

Track listing 
 "Amolação" (Samuel Rosa/Chico Amaral) – 2:35
 "Jackie Tequila" (Samuel Rosa/Chico Amaral) – 4:10
 "Esmola" (Samuel Rosa/Chico Amaral) – 2:38
 "O Beijo e a Reza" (Samuel Rosa/Chico Amaral) – 4:59
 "A Cerca" (Samuel Rosa/Fernando Furtado/Chico Amaral) – 3:28
 "É Proibido Fumar" (Roberto Carlos/Erasmo Carlos) – 3:11
 "Te Ver" (Samuel Rosa/Lelo Zaneti/Chico Amaral) – 4:36
 "Chega Disso!" (Samuel Rosa/Chico Amaral) – 4:04
 "Sam" (Samuel Rosa/Chico Amaral) – 3:45
 "Estivador" (Samuel Rosa/Chico Amaral) – 3:24
 "Pacato Cidadão" (Samuel Rosa/Chico Amaral) – 4:03

Personnel 

 Jarbas Agnelli – Art Direction
 Chico Amaral – Saxophone
 Everaldo Andrade – Assistant Engineer
 Guilherme Calicchio – Engineer, Assobios
 Jorge Davidson – A&R
 Vitor Farias – Engineer, Mixing
 Haroldo Ferretti – Drums, Bateria
 Roberto Frejat – Producer
 Ricardo Garcia – Mastering
 Gauguin – Producer
 Dudu Marote – Producer
 Renato Munoz – Engineer, Assistant Engineer
 Henrique Portugal – Keyboards
 Samuel Rosa – Guitar, Vocals
 Skank – Producer, Performer
 Marcio Thees – Assistant Engineer
 Ronaldo Viana – Production Coordination, Project Coordinator
 João Vianna – Trumpet, Trumpet (Bass)
 Lelo Zaneti – Bass, Baixo

Album certification

References 

1994 albums
Skank (band) albums